Pagli Suraiya   Sania Sultana Liza's second solo album was released on 17 July 2015.

Track listing

References

2015 albums
Bengali-language albums